The Opposition in the Australian territory of the Australian Capital Territory comprises the largest party or coalition of parties not in Government.  The Opposition's purpose is to hold the Government to account and constitute a "Government-in-waiting" should the existing Government fall. To that end, a Leader of the Opposition and Shadow Ministers for the various government departments question the Chief Minister and Ministers on Government policy and administration, and formulate the policy the Opposition would pursue in Government. It is sometimes styled "His Majesty's Loyal Opposition" to demonstrate that although it opposes the Government, it remains loyal to the King.

The current Leader of the Opposition is Liberal Leader Elizabeth Lee, and Giulia Jones is the Deputy Leader.

Current Shadow Ministry
The current shadow ministry was announced on 8 April 2021. It is led by Opposition Leader Elizabeth Lee

See also
Government of the Australian Capital Territory
 Opposition (Australia)

References

Politics of the Australian Capital Territory